Solon Stylien J. Vlasto (1852–1927)  was the editor of a Greek paper in New York City, THR1`Atlantis.

Biography
He was born in September 1852 in Greece. He migrated to the United States in 1873  and sold lamp oil. In 1894 he started Atlantis. He married and had a son, Solon G. Vlasto, who was born in Athens.

He died in 1927.

References

1852 births
1927 deaths
American newspaper editors
Nationality missing